A trattoria (plural: trattorie) is an Italian-style eating establishment that is generally much less formal than a ristorante, but more formal than an osteria. 

A trattoria rooted in tradition may typically provide no printed menu, casual service, wine sold by the decanter rather than the bottle, and low prices, with an emphasis on a steady clientele rather than on haute cuisine.  Food tends to be modest but plentiful, mostly following regional and local recipes, sometimes even served family-style, at common tables. This homely tradition has waned in recent decades. Many trattorie have taken on some of the trappings of a ristorante, providing relatively few concessions to the old rustic and familial style. The name trattoria has also been adopted by some high-level restaurants.

Optionally, trattoria food could be bought in containers to be taken home. Etymologically, the word is cognate with the French term traiteur (a caterer providing take-out food). Derived in Italian from trarre, meaning 'to treat' (from the Latin tractare/trahere, i.e. 'to draw'), its etymology has also been linked to the Latin term littera tractoria, which referred to a letter ordering provision of food and drink for officials traveling on the business of the Holy Roman Empire.

See also 
 Bistro
 Cabaret
 Tavern

References

Italian cuisine
Italian restaurants
Restaurants in Italy
Restaurants by type